San Lorenzo Airport  is an airport serving the Marañón River town of San Lorenzo in the Loreto Region of Peru.

Airlines and Destinations

See also

Transport in Peru
List of airports in Peru

References

External links
OpenStreetMap - San Lorenzo
SkyVector - San Lorenzo

Airports in Peru
Buildings and structures in Loreto Region